The men's omnium competition at the 2018 UEC European Track Championships was held on 4 August 2018.

Results

Scratch race
The scratch race was started at 14:25.

Tempo race
The tempo race was started at 16:26.

Elimination race
The elimination race was started at 19:13.

Points race
The points race was started at 20:01.

Final standings
The final ranking is given by the sum of the points obtained in the 4 specialties.

References

Men's omnium
European Track Championships – Men's omnium